Commander in Chief is an American political drama television series that focused on the fictional administration and family of Mackenzie Allen (portrayed by Geena Davis), the first female president of the United States, who ascends to the post from the vice presidency after the death of the sitting president from a sudden cerebral aneurysm.

The series began broadcasting on ABC on Tuesday, September 27, 2005, at 9 p.m. Eastern Time, although most countries outside North America began screening the series in mid-2006.

The show was ranked No. 1 on Tuesday nights until Fox's American Idol started in January. The show was also the No. 1 new show of the season until CBS' Criminal Minds surpassed it. Its major competitor in the 9:00 p.m. timeslot was FOX's House, which aired after American Idol.

The series was created by American director Rod Lurie, director of the films The Contender and Deterrence.

The network replaced Lurie with Steven Bochco as show runner. After ratings continued declining, Bochco was replaced by Dee Johnson. Further declining ratings brought about a hiatus, a timeslot change and ultimately cancellation announced in May 2006, with the final episodes airing the following month.

Characters

Main
Mackenzie Allen (Geena Davis)
Mac is a former member of Congress from Connecticut and chancellor of the University of Richmond. An independent placed on the Republican presidential ticket alongside Teddy Bridges. It is a common belief she was the reason Bridges won the election. Mac becomes the first female vice president, a very popular one at that, and, upon Bridges' death, she becomes the first female president of the United States. During the first season, Mac decides she wants to run for re-election, with her political strategists stating her campaign is likely to secure her the middle fifty percent of voters.
Nathan Templeton (Donald Sutherland)
Templeton is a Republican congressional leader from Florida and The Speaker of the United States House of Representatives. He was Bridges' choice to succeed him as president, and thus he harbors significant resentment towards Mac, who refused to resign from her position. He and Mac slowly become more acquainted with one another over the course of the series, and begin to develop a political kinship. He has his own intentions to run as a Republican candidate in the next election. He is married, with no children.
Jim Gardner (Harry Lennix) 
Jim was Bridges' chief of staff, and was asked by Allen to continue into her administration. A loyal supporter of his Commander in Chief, Gardner finds himself resented by her husband, Rod Calloway, who served as her vice presidential chief of staff. Gardner becomes Vice President of the United States following the resignation of Keaton.
Rod Calloway (Kyle Secor)
Calloway is Mac's husband. He was her vice-presidential chief of staff, and thus was initially resentful of Gardner. During the first season, Calloway encourages Mac to give him an office in the West Wing, and a real role in the administration. He later returns to a more traditional First Person role, though Mac's mother continues to act as hostess.
Kelly Ludlow (Ever Carradine)
Brought into Allen's administration from her vice presidential residential staff, Ludlow was the VP's communications director. She is promoted to Press Secretary ahead of the incumbent Deputy Press Secretary, though later proves herself particularly capable in this role. As the series progresses, Mac offers her a more in-depth role in the administration, and thus keeps her apprised of numerous political developments.
Richard McDonald (Mark-Paul Gosselaar)
Dickie is a campaign advisor and political strategist hired by Rod Calloway into Mac's administration. He idolizes the President, and believes her unquestioning principles to be unmatched in Washington. He often irritates senior staff by focusing only on the political outcomes of personal situations, although he states he does so in order to secure Mac the middle fifty percent of voters.
Horace, Rebecca, and Amy Calloway (Matt Lanter, Caitlin Wachs, and Jasmine Anthony)
Horace, Rebecca, and Amy are Mac and Rod's children. Horace and Rebecca, aged sixteen, are twins, and Amy is six years old. Rebecca frowns on her mother's choice to assume the presidency and holds more conservative political views than her mother, though Horace is more supportive.

Recurring 
 Vince Taylor (Anthony Azizi); a special aide to the president.
 Jayne Murray (Natasha Henstridge); the Speaker's chief of staff.
 Warren Keaton (Peter Coyote); the vice president of the United States who resigns in episode fifteen.
 Kate Allen (Polly Bergen); Mac's mother and the White House hostess.
 Mike Fleming (Matt Barr); a guy from Becca's high school and her boyfriend later on.
 Joan Greer (Julie Ann Emery); a Secret Service agent.
 Reporter Steve (Scott Atkinson); reporter that appears in three episodes of Season 1.

Episodes

"Little Shop of Horace"

This episode was scheduled to air on February 21, 2006, after "Wind Beneath My Wings", and a promo was released.

Mac weighs her options on how to deal with a situation in Africa when she learns genocide is taking place in a country there, and it becomes clear there are no easy solutions. Meanwhile, at Dickie's suggestion, Mac considers firing her current Cabinet - many of them holdovers from Teddy Bridges' administration - and bringing in her own in order to start with a clean slate going into her re-election campaign. At the same time, Rod makes a scheduled appearance at a joint U.S.-Cuban children's gymnastics convention, where a freak accident sparks an international situation, and Horace asks Rebecca's friend, Stacey, for help with his homework—but the two end up doing more than just studying.

The episode was written by Tom Szentgyorgyi and directed by Carol Banker.

Reception 
Commander in Chief received generally positive reviews (Davis' performance was largely praised as being a "successful comeback vehicle"), with an aggregate score of 56/100 (26 reviews) on Metacritic. Critics in major U.S. media, cited on the review site Rotten Tomatoes were generally enthusiastic. Some critics described the series as lacking "credibility," approaching "fantasy," and being less about the presidency than about "gender politics."

Reason magazine charged that the series glorified the "Imperial Presidency" and that it favored using government force to impose the personal values of some Americans on others who disagreed with them and to impose the values of those Americans on the rest of the world.

Negative comparisons were drawn with 24's black president David Palmer, as while in that show a black president was depicted as having been voted into office under normal circumstances, Commander in Chief'''s storyline showed a female president only coming into the presidency because the existing president dies in office.

On the day the series premiered, Davis was reported to have said in an interview, "This is a show about every aspect of the life of a person who is president, the personal side and the public side."  A November 2005 review in USA Today noted the show's focus was more on Allen's family than world or national political events; in the same review, Allen's leadership style was compared and contrasted favorably with that of Josiah Bartlet of The West Wing.  A reviewer for United Features Syndicate wrote that "While 'Commander' avoids the overt wonkery of 'West Wing,' it also fails to give its audience much credit for knowing history or current events."

The episode "Ties That Bind" generated controversy and negative press in its fictional depiction of the bordering suburb of Hyattsville, Maryland, as having one of the fastest growing crime rates in the United States. It also indirectly depicted the town as being an urban ghetto dominated by poor minorities. The city and Prince George's County were very upset at ABC and somewhat surprised as well at this depiction; in reality, the city is ethnically mixed, middle-income and mostly suburban in density and character. On May 1, 2006, ABC formally apologized to both the city and county.

Ratings
The series had good ratings initially, but they waned in subsequent weeks.

The series went on hiatus after its January 24, 2006 episode. In its place, ABC promoted a new Arrested Development-type show titled Sons & Daughters. Commander in Chief was scheduled to return on April 18. However, on March 29, ABC announced that it would instead return on April 13 and move from its Tuesday 9 p.m. slot to a 10 p.m. slot on Thursdays, directly competing with CBS hit Without a Trace and longtime NBC standby ER. Some media  experts thought that ABC was hoping the show could be saved by gaining viewers from the surprise reality hit American Inventor aired right before Commander in Chief. However, the reality show saw its ratings drop by half and proved to be a weak lead in to Commander in Chief. 

The show's return on April 13 was met by low ratings in its new time slot. Preliminary ratings available on April 14 indicated that only 8.2 million viewers (2.4 rating/7 share in the 18-49 demographic) tuned in for the show's return. CBS's Without a Trace dominated the hour with 18.6 million viewers. NBC's ER, airing a repeat, beat Commander in Chief in the 18-49 demographic (2.6/7 versus 2.4/7), although it had about two million viewers less overall. 

ABC pulled the series from its lineup on May 2, 2006, and on May 13 announced that the show had been cancelled. The remaining three episodes of the season were broadcast after the ratings year had ended.

Production
 Starting with the episode Rubie Dubidoux and the Brown Bound Express, Steven Bochco replaced Rod Lurie as head executive producer and showrunner. Bochco's changes included a staff of new writers and a new title design similar in style to that of NBC's The West Wing.
 Beginning with the episode State of the Unions'', Dee Johnson replaced Steven Bochco as head executive producer and showrunner.
 Part of the Greater Richmond Children's Choir (GRCC) of Richmond, Virginia was the French Choir in the pilot episode, making an ironic connection between real life and fiction since Mackenzie Allen was Chancellor of the University of Richmond when Bridges tapped her as his running mate as seen as a flashback in the pilot, the scenes in Paris were also filmed at the University of Richmond.
 Former Clinton Administration National Security Advisor Sandy Berger was signed on as an advisor to the show.

Filming locations
 City Hall - 200 N. Spring St., Downtown, Los Angeles, California, USA
Oriole Park at Camden Yards - 333 W. Camden Street, Baltimore, Maryland, USA 
 Raleigh Studios - 5300 Melrose Ave., Hollywood, California, USA (studio)
University of Richmond - 28 Westhampton Way, Richmond, Virginia, USA
Washington, District of Columbia, USA
The Huntington Library - San Marino, California, USA
 Intersection of North Vermont Avenue and Russell Avenue, Los Feliz, California, USA

Awards and nominations

Home media
On April 28, 2006, Buena Vista Home Video formally announced the release of Commander In Chief: The Complete First Season. However, following the show's cancellation, it was decided that it should be split into two volumes.

In Italy, the 5 DVD boxset was released on December 1, 2006 and it contains all original episodes dubbed in Italian plus voice tracks in English and Spanish and also special features the Pilot episode with comments by Rod Lurie and deleted scenes.

International broadcasts
 - Previously: Seven Network Australia (Original airing) Currently: 7TWO (Encore Screening - 2009). Also screening on Disney plus Australia.
 Asia - STAR World, Hallmark Channel
 - Fox life
 - Fox life as "Главнокомандващ"
 - CTV (English), Historia (French)
 - TV 2
 - Fox life
 - Nelonen
 - M6 then Téva
 - Sat.1 as "Welcome, Mrs. President"
 - ATV World as 最高統帥 (Commander in Chief)
 - Viasat 3 as "Az elnöknő" (Mrs. President)
 - STAR World
 - Metro TV
 - RTÉ One
 - Yes Stars as "Gvirti Hanasie" (Madam President)
 - Rai Uno and Fox Life as "Una donna alla Casa Bianca" (A woman at the White House)
 - Fox life as "マダム・プレジデント 星条旗をまとった女神"
 - NTV
 Latin America - Sony Entertainment Television
 - Fox life
 - Fox life
 - 8TV
Middle East - Showtime Arabia / MBC 4
 - Foxlife
 - TV2
 - TVNORGE
 - STAR World
 - STAR World From October 12, 2007
 - TVP1 as "Pani prezydent" (Madam President)
 - SIC as "Senhora Presidente" (Mrs. President)
 - Fox Life
 - RTS 2 as "Predsednica" (Mrs. President)
 - MediaCorp TV Channel 5
 - POP TV as "Gospa predsednica" (Mrs. President)
 - SABC 2
 - KBS2
 - People&Arts/La Sexta as "Señora Presidenta" (Mrs. President)
 - TV4
 - SF zwei as "Welcome, Mrs. President" (German+English Bilingual)
 - Public Television Service as "白宮女總統" (Female President at the White House) 
 - TrueVisions16 Hallmark Channel as "ประธานาธิบดีดอกไม้เหล็ก"(Iron Flower Mrs. President)
 - CNMG
 - DiziMax
 - ABC1 (Apr 2006), More4 (10 October 2006), with repeats on More4, Channel 4, and E4

References

External links
 
 

2005 American television series debuts
2006 American television series endings
2000s American political television series
2000s American drama television series
American Broadcasting Company original programming
American political drama television series
English-language television shows
Television series by ABC Studios
Television shows set in Washington, D.C.
White House in fiction